Scoliacma pactolias is a moth in the family Erebidae. It was described by Edward Meyrick in 1886. It is found in Australia, where it has been recorded from the Australian Capital Territory, New South Wales, Queensland, South Australia, Tasmania and Victoria.

The wingspan is about 25 mm. The forewings are mottled dark yellow and the hindwings are yellow.

References

Moths described in 1886
Lithosiina